Maude Wayne (born Maude Wehn) was an American film actress who was active in Hollywood during the silent era.

Biography 
Maude was born in Beatrice, Nebraska, to Louis Wehn and Maria McCathern. She was the youngest of the couple's children, and her brother Richard Wayne also became an actor.

After starting as an extra in Triangle productions, she began appearing in Keystone films , often as one of Mack Sennett's bathing beauties. Following a few years spent in comedies, she later transitioned to heavier, vampier, more dramatic roles at Paramount, sometimes playing the leading lady to Rudolph Valentino.

She retired from acting in the late 1920s before she married fellow actor Johnnie Walker.

Selected filmography 

 Held by the Law (1927)
 Fashions for Women (1927)
 When Husbands Flirt (1925)
 His Forgotten Wife (1924)
 Leap Year (1924)
 The Song of Love (1923)
 The Silent Partner (1923)
 Alias the Night Wind (1923)
 Hollywood (1923)
 Her Accidental Husband (1923)

References 

1890 births
1983 deaths
People from Beatrice, Nebraska
American film actresses
American silent film actresses
20th-century American actresses